The Dorset Teddy Bear Museum is a teddy bear museum in Dorchester, Dorset, southern England.

The museum includes Teddy Bear House and displays antique and other teddy bears. Bears on display include Paddington Bear, Rupert Bear, and Winnie the Pooh. The earliest bear dates from 1906 and there are also life-sized bears.

References 

Museums with year of establishment missing
Museums in Dorchester, Dorset
Toy museums in England
Teddy bear museums